Adamo Demolition (Adamo Group) is a Detroit-based asbestos remediation and demolition company founded in 1964 that specializes in industrial projects.

Works
They have demolished many well-known, major structures such as: Georgia Dome, Park Avenue Hotel, Pontiac Silverdome, Northville Psychiatric Hospital, and the Riverwalk Hotel. They have also controversially demolished many buildings considered historically significant such as the Lafayette Building and Madison-Lenox Hotel. In 1978, the company won a case in the United States Supreme Court that led to reformed NESHAP regulations. 

On December 2, 2015, Adamo Group's president and CEO, John Adamo Jr., was killed in an accident while overseeing an Ohio demolition project. He was 57.  

By 2019, Adamo Group had demolished 3,397 buildings for the city of Detroit, earning over $56 million.

Adamo Group was a suspect in an FBI investigation into corruption involving Detroit City demolition officials and contractors in the city's blight-removal program; the report determined that no rules in bid selection were infringed, but that their closed-door meeting practices "lacked fairness, openness, and transparency." They later were suspended for 90 days from bidding on Detroit demolition contracts, and again received negative publicity in association with the blight-removal program again when they accidentally demolished a house neighboring their intended project.

References

External links
Official Website
Pool Demolition

Demolition
1964 establishments in Michigan
Construction and civil engineering companies of the United States